Craig Balme (born 5 March 1961) is a former Australian rules footballer who played with Richmond in the Victorian Football League (VFL) and Norwood in the South Australian National Football League (SANFL).

Balme, who started out at Richmond in the under 19s, made three senior appearances for Richmond, from rounds three to five in the 1983 VFL season. He then joined Norwood, coached by his brother Neil. From 1984 to 1995, Balme played 254 SANFL games for Norwood. He was a full-back in the club's 1984 premiership team and memorably clashed with opposition full-forward Tim Evans in the grand final win over Port Adelaide, before the first bounce.

References

1961 births
Australian rules footballers from Western Australia
Richmond Football Club players
Norwood Football Club players
Living people